Üsküdar is a large and densely populated district of Istanbul, Turkey, on the Anatolian shore of the Bosphorus. It is bordered to the north by Beykoz, to the east by Ümraniye, to the southeast by Ataşehir and to the south by Kadıköy; with Karaköy, Kabataş, Beşiktaş, and the historic city center of Fatih facing it on the opposite shore to the west. Üsküdar has been a conservative cultural center of the Anatolian/Asian side of Istanbul since Ottoman times with its numerous grand and little historic mosques and dergahs. It is home to about half a million people. 

Üsküdar is a major transport hub, with ferries to Eminönü, Karaköy, Kabataş, Besiktaş and some of the Bosphorus suburbs. Üsküdar is a stop on the Marmaray rail service at the point where it starts its journey under the Bosphorus, re-emerging on the European side at Sirkeci. Via Marmaray, Üsküdar is linked to Gebze on the Asian side of the city and Halkali on the European side. Üsküdar is also a stop on the M5 Metro line to Çekmeköy. Buses run along the Bosphorus shore all the way up north to Anadaolu Kavağı in Beykoz district. A bus service also operates to the summer town of Şile on the Black Sea. 

Üsküdar started as Chrysopolis (Greek: Χρυσόπολις, 'Golden City') and later became known as Scutari (in Greek), a name it retained until the founding of the Turkish Republic.

Etymology 
 was originally called  during the Byzantine Empire. This may commemorate the leather  shields used by guards since the word scutari means 'raw tanned leather'.

History

Chrysopolis 
Üsküdar was founded in the 7th century BC by ancient Greek colonists from Megara  a few decades before Byzantium was founded on the opposite shore. It was originally called Chrysopolis ('Golden City'). According to an ancient Greek geographer, the city received the name Chrysopolis because the Persian empire had a gold depository there or because it was associated with Agamemnon and Chryseis' son, Chryses. On the other hand, according to an 18th-century writer, it received the name because of the excellence of its harbor. The city was used as a harbor and shipyard and was an important staging post in the wars between the Greeks and Persians. In 410 BC Chrysopolis was taken by the Athenian general Alcibiades, and the Athenians used it thenceforth to charge a toll on ships coming from and going to the Black Sea. Long overshadowed by its neighbor Chalcedon during the Hellenistic and Roman period, it maintained its identity and increased its prosperity until it surpassed Chalcedon. Due to its less favorable location with respect to the currents of the Bosporus, however, it never surpassed Byzantium.
In AD 324, the final battle between Constantine I, Emperor of the West, and Licinius, Emperor of the East, in which Constantine defeated Licinius, took place at Chrysopolis. When Constantine made Byzantium his capital, Chrysopolis, together with Chalcedon, became suburbs. Chrysopolis remained important throughout the Byzantine period because all trade routes to Asia started there, and all Byzantine army units headed to Asia mustered there.
During the brief usurpation of the Armenian general Artabasdos, his eldest son, Niketas, was defeated with his forces at Chrysopolis by the army of Constantine V, before Artabasdos was finally deposed by the legitimate emperor Constantine and blinded. For this reason, and because of its location across from Constantinople, it was a natural target for anyone aiming at the capital. Also, in the 8th century AD it was taken by a small band of Arabs, who caused considerable destruction and panic in Constantinople, before withdrawing. In 988, a rebellion that nearly toppled Basil II began in Chrysopolis, before he was able to crush with the aid of Russian mercenaries.

Skoutarion, Scutari 

In the 12th century, the city changed its name to Skoutarion, the name deriving from the Emperor's Skoutarion Palace nearby. In 1338 the Ottoman leader Orhan Gazi took Skoutarion, giving the Ottomans a base within sight of Constantinople for the first time.
In the Ottoman period Üsküdar was one of the three communities outside the city walls of Constantinople (along with Eyüp and Galata). The area was a major burial ground, and today many large cemeteries remain, including Karacaahmet Mezarlığı, Bülbülderesi Mezarlığı, and a number of Jewish and Christian cemeteries. Karacaahmet Mezarlığı is one of Istanbul's largest cemeteries. The Bülbülderesi cemetery is next to Fevziye Hatun mosque.
The neighborhood suffered during the ethnic-religious violence of the 6 September 1955, Istanbul pogrom. Turkish rioters looted Greek and Armenian Christian shops and many Greeks and Armenians subsequently fled the country.

Üsküdar today 

The district of Üsküdar is one of Istanbul's oldest-established residential areas. It is directly opposite the old city of Eminönü and transport across the Bosphorus is easy by boat or bridge. So there are well-established communities here, many retired people, and many residents commute to the European side for work or school (being cheap and central Üsküdar has a large student population). During the rush-hour, the waterfront is bustling with people running from ferryboats and motorboats onto buses and minibuses. Üsküdar also has the smell of the sea, the sound of foghorns, motorboats and seagulls and one of the best views of the city.

, the central square is being dug up for a tunnel under the Bosphorus which will carry an underground railway. However, this is predictably continuously running into artifacts of great archaeological value.
The area behind the ferry dock is a busy shopping district, with many restaurants (including the well-known Kanaat Lokantası serving Ottoman cuisine, olive oil-based dishes, and ice cream) and a number of important Ottoman mosques (see section below). However, there are relatively few cafes, cinemas, billiard halls, and places for youth to congregate.
The private Üsküdar University, founded by the Human Values and Mental Health Foundation, has a campus here.
Uskudar has two public libraries: Şemsi Pasha Mosque Public Library (built in 1953) and Selimiye Public Library.

Neighborhoods 

Üsküdar is a municipality within borders of Istanbul Metropolitan Municipality. The municipality is subdivided into neighborhoods. The boundaries and names of the official neighborhoods change from time to time and sometimes do not correspond to historically recognized neighborhoods or to residents' own perceptions.
The most prominent neighborhood is Üsküdar's historic center, centered on the ferry docks and roughly corresponding to the current Mimar Sinan neighborhood (former Selmanağa, Tembel Hacı Mehmet, and İnkılap neighborhoods). This area includes large historic mosques, many businesses and markets, and is a transportation hub.
Other prominent neighborhoods include the former villages on the Bosphorus to the north of the historic center, Kuzguncuk, Beylerbeyi, Çengelköy, Kuleli, Vaniköy (now part of Kandilli), and Kandilli; the neighborhoods along the Bosphorus shore south of the historic center, Salacak, Harem (now part of Aziz Mahmud Hudayı), and Selimiye; and the mostly residential neighborhoods on the hilltops and hillsides, Doğancılar (now mostly part of Aziz Mahmud Hudayı), İmrahor (now part of Salacak), Selamsız (now part of Selamiali), Bağlarbaşı (now part of Altunizade), Altunizade, Acıbadem, Küçük Çamlıca, and Büyük Çamlıca (mostly in Kısıklı, Burhaniye, and Ferah).

Salacak 

Üsküdar's long promenade along the coast from the center down in southern direction towards the bus station at Harem is popular in summer as it commands views of the European shore of Topkapı Palace, Hagia Sophia, Sultan Ahmed Mosque (The Blue Mosque), Taksim and Beşiktaş. This promenade is lined with cafes and restaurants, the most prominent of which is not on the coast but out in the water: the Maiden's Tower, a small tower just off the coast that has existed since Byzantine times, when it was called Leander's Tower. From time to time it has been used as a toll booth; now it is used as an upscale restaurant and a venue for wedding parties. The name comes from a legend about a princess shut in the tower.
On nice days people gather on the shore to fish, sit and drink tea or to enjoy being out on the water in little rowing boats. The Ayazma Mosque (1760) stands on the shore opposite the tower. The streets of Salacak behind the coast, in the area called Imrahor, are attractive and still hold a number of classic Ottoman wooden houses. The legendary 17th-century Hezarfen Ahmet Çelebi is said to have landed here on his hang-glider flight across the Bosphorus.
Further down along the coast is the Harem neighborhood, which contains a major intercity bus terminal and the Selimiye Barracks, where Florence Nightingale once tended wounded British soldiers. Behind the coast, towards the east, Üsküdar climbs steeply into the residential areas uphill, Bağlarbaşı and Doğancılar.

Doğancılar 
A pleasant neighborhood on the hill above Salacak, with plenty of trees between the buildings and a small park. There is a wide avenue winding uphill from Üsküdar, which has plenty of shops and cafes, and also a theater (the Musahipzade Celal Sahnesi), the fire station, the former women's prison (Paşakapısı Prison), Burhan Felek High School and Doğancılar mosque (opposite the park).

Bağlarbaşı and Altunizade 

Formerly orchards and fruit-gardens, it became a residential neighborhood in the 19th century, home to the typical Istanbul urban mix of Greeks, Jews, Turks, and Armenians. The neighborhood still has an Armenian school and the Armenian church of Surp Garabed, built in 1844. Until the 1990s the area remained a middle-class residential neighborhood, and today is still an attractive district with a mixture of housing and office/commercial property. A number of properties have been converted to office and business use. Altunizade is still an attractive residential neighborhood, home to the large and busy Capitol shopping and entertainment center. Altunizade was established in the early 19th century by Altunizade İsmail Zühtü Pasha. He also commissioned Altunizade Mosque, which was built in 1866.
There are a number of well-known schools within the district including Üsküdar American Academy, one of the oldest established schools in the city, Üsküdar High School, a state school, Haydarpasha High School, Marmara University's faculty of theology; and Burhan Felek sports complex.

Selamsız 

Selamsız is an old residential neighborhood, home to a Roma community and Roma culture.

Acıbadem 
The top half of the attractive district Acıbadem also belongs to Üsküdar, including Acıbadem and Academic hospitals. This avenue with its patisseries, ice-cream parlors and cafés, is the center one of the most pleasant neighborhoods of Istanbul, consisting of tree-lined streets and well-planned housing areas, as well as Çamlıca Girls’ High School set in a tree-lined garden..

Paşalimanı 
Just past Üsküdar the coastline is called Paşalimanı. Liman means "port" in Turkish (from Greek) and boats would moor here. A large stone building on the shore, built as a tobacco warehouse by late-Ottoman architect Vedat Tek, has been completely renovated and now serves as headquarters of Ciner Grubu (Ciner Group), an industrial conglomerate. There is a small area of parkland right on the shore and the entrance to the large Fetih Paşa Korusu park is here.

Kuzguncuk 

A Bosphorus village of streets with little shops, seaside cafes, and many old-fashioned wooden houses, Kuzguncuk has a village atmosphere. There is a ferry dock and a little park on the waterfront. The village was called Kosinitsa in the Byzantine period and until recently the people of Kuzguncuk were the typical Istanbul cosmopolitan mixture of Turks, Greeks, Jews, and Armenians. There are very few non-Muslims left today and the area has become an attractive middle-class neighborhood, home to people like film director Uğur Yücel, sculptor Kuzgun Acar, painter Acar Başkut (whose studio is in the village), architects Nevzat Sayin and Cengiz Bektaş, and the late poet Can Yücel. The neighborhood is also portrayed in the novel Mediterranean Waltz (Kumral Ada Mavi Tuna) by Buket Uzuner.

Beylerbeyi 

Just beyond the Bosphorus Bridge is Beylerbeyi, an area known in Istanbul for its fish restaurants, and for the Beylerbeyi Palace on the shore. Abdülhamit II of Ottoman Empire died for here in 1918.

Çengelköy 
Formerly a waterfront village, known for the cucumbers grown in gardens on the green hillsides behind. There are a number of very grand seaside villas. The village has a number of shops, bakeries and waterfront cafes offering gorgeous views of the Bosphorus that tend to be busy, especially at weekends. Since the mid-1990s new housing estates have been built on the hillsides and now there are always queues of traffic through Çengelköy. But the village retains some of its romantic charm. The word  means "hook" or "anchor" in Turkish, and  means "village"; apparently there were blacksmiths or metalworkers in the village in Ottoman times.
The highly prestigious Kuleli Military High School is on the Bosphorus just beyond Çengelköy. Most graduates from here go on to military academy and careers as army officers.

Çamlıca 
This hill, known as Tchamlidja in 19th-century spelling, has the highest point in Istanbul and commands a panoramic view of the entire city. One of the most prestiged schools of Turkey, Bilfen College is located on the Çamlıca hill.

Climate 
Üsküdar experiences a humid subtropical climate (Cfa/Cf) according to both Köppen and Trewartha climate classifications, with cool winters and warm to hot summers. Unlike most of southern Istanbul, Üsküdar is cooler than its surroundings, with an average temperature slightly below , and an AHS heat zone rating of 3. However, its coastal location still does allow it to be classified as USDA hardiness zone 9a.

Sights of Üsküdar 

Though densely populated, Üsküdar has many areas of greenery, including the Çamlıca hills, the Bosphorus coastline, and various parks. In addition, the area has a high concentration of historic buildings and religious sites.

Parks 
Fethi Paşa Korusu is a large park on the hillside that extends down to the Bosphorus shore, slightly beyond Üsküdar in the area called Paşalimanı. It is named after Fetih Ahmet Paşa an Ottoman prince who among other things was responsible for industrializing the glassworks of Ottoman Turkey, and had a home in the area. The parkland is in fact privately owned and let to the state on condition that it is preserved as a park. The owners are the estate of Turkish industrialist Nuri Demirağ. There is a café in the park, a stone waterfall which children climb on and a small stage area where on Friday evenings in summer a band of amateur musicians give open-air concerts at sunset. At weekends the young lovers of Üsküdar gather here to stroll and cuddle in the shade.

Mosques 

Üsküdar is home to over 180 mosques, many of them historic Ottoman buildings, many built for women of the imperial harem, and many built by the architect Mimar Sinan. Among the first things one sees on arriving by ferry are two mosques near the ferry terminal, both of them designed by Sinan. The larger one is the Mihrimah Sultan Mosque, sometimes called the İskele (Dock) Mosque, built by a daughter of Suleiman the Magnificent; the smaller one is the Şemsi Pasha Mosque, built by a vizier of Suleiman's. Şemsi Pasha has a small library building in the courtyard.
Opposite the Mihrimah Sultan Mosque is the large Yeni Valide Mosque, commissioned by Ahmet III's mother. Uphill from the dock in the Valideiatik neighborhood is the Atik Valide Mosque, built by Murat III's mother and also designed by Sinan. Further uphill from there is the smaller Çinili (Tiled) Mosque. In Karacaahmet Cemetery is the large Şakirin Mosque, built in 2009.
The Namazgâh Mosque (built in 1860) in the eastern part of Üsküdar, close to the border with Ümraniye, is one of the few historical wooden mosques in Istanbul.
Other important mosques of Üsküdar include Ahmediye, Ahmet Ağa, Ahmet Çelebi, Altunizade, Ayazma, Aziz Mahmut Hudai, Baki Efendi, Beylerbeyi, Bodrumi Ömer Lütfi Efendi, Bostancı, Bulgurlu, Çakırcıbaşı, Fatih, Gülfem Hatun, Hacı Ömer, İmrahor, İranlılar, İstavroz, Kandilli, Kara Davut Pasha, Kaymak Mustafa Pasha, Kısıklı, Küleli Bahçe, Malatyalı İsmail Ağa, Mirzazade, Paşalimanı, Rum Mehmet Pasha, Selimiye, Solak Sinan, Tahır Efendi, Üryanizade, and Vanikoy.

Churches 

Churches of Üsküdar include  the İlya Profiti (Prophet Elijah) Greek Orthodox Church in Muratreis (present building built in 1831), the Kandilli Khristos Rum Ortodoks Kilisesi (built in 1810), the Surp Garabet (Saint John the Baptist) Armenian Church in Murat Reis (first church on the site, 1590; present building built 1888), the Surp Haç (Holy Cross) Armenian Church in Selami Ali (built 1676, rebuilt 1880), the Surp Krikor Lusavoriç (Saint Gregory the Illuminator) Armenian Church in Kuzguncuk (first built 1835, rebuilt 1861), and the Surp Yergodasan Arakelots (Twelve Apostoles) Armenian Church in Kandilli (built 1846).

Synagogues 
Synagogues of Üsküdar include  Bet Yaakov (built 1878) and Bet Nissim (built in the 1840s).

Other religious buildings 
Important tekkes (dervish lodges) include the Aziz Mahmud Hudayi Tekke (Aziz Mahmud Hudayi (1541–1628), who is buried in Üsküdar and was the founder of the Jelveti Sufi order); the Nasuhi Efendi Tekke (Nasuhi Efendi was the founder of the Nasuhiyye Khalwati Sufi order and the grandfather of the Turkish-American music producer Ahmet Ertegun); and the famous Özbekler Tekkesi, where the Ertegun family members are buried.
Important tombs in Üsküdar include those of Aziz Mahmud Hudayi, Hacı Ahmet Pasha, Halil Pasha, İbrahim Edhem Pasha, Karaca Ahmet, and Rum Mehmet Pasha.
The Karacaahmet Cemetery, the largest cemetery in Istanbul and one of the oldest, has many notable burials. It runs between Üsküdar and Kadıköy.

s and s 

Other notable Ottoman features to be seen in Üsküdar are the many s (drinking water sources) and s (kiosks for distribution of drinks). One of the largest and most visible s is the fountain of Ahmet III (1728–29), an impressive marble structure in the center of Üsküdar near the ferry docks.
Other important s of Üsküdar include Gülnuş Emetullah Valide Sultan (1709, next to the Yeni Valide Mosque), Hüseyin Avni Pasha (1874, Paşalimanı), Mustafa III (1760, next to the Ayazma Mosque), and Selim III (1802, in Çiçekçi, Harem İskelesi Street).
Important s of Üsküdar include those of Hacı Hüseyin Pasha (1865, near the Karacaahmet Cemetery), Halil Pasha (1617, attached to Halil Pasha's tomb), Hudayi (first built in the 1590s but later much remodeled, near Aziz Mahmud Hudayi's tomb), Sadettin Efendi (1741, near the tomb of Karacaahmet Cemetery), Şeyhülislam Arif Hikmet Bey (1858, near the Kartal Baba Mosque), Valide Çinili (1640, next to the Çinili Mosque), Valide-i Cedid (1709, next to the Yeni Valide Mosque), and Ziya Bey (1866, near the tomb of Karacaahmet).

Museums and palaces 

The Florence Nightingale Museum inside the Selimiye Barracks in Selimiye displays items associated with Nightingale and her medical work in Istanbul during the Crimean War. 
Beylerbeyi Palace in Beylerbeyi was built for Sultan Abdulaziz in the 1860s, and used as the last place Sultan Abdul Hamid II was held under house arrest by the Revolutionaries.

Education 
 Üsküdar American Academy (formerly American Academy for Girls)
 Tarabya British Schools has its Çengelköy campus there.
 Üsküdar University
 Istanbul Şehir University

Twin municipalities 
 Saraj, Skopje
 Brooklyn, New York
  Shibuya, Tokyo

Notable residents 
Richard Guyon (1813–1856), British-born Hungarian soldier, general in the Hungarian revolutionary army
Maximus the Confessor – Byzantine monk, theologian and scholar. He entered a monastery in Chrysopolis in the early 7th century.
Philippicus - Byzantine general; a monk in Chrysopolis between 602–610, and buried in Chrysopolis.
Sergius I of Constantinople - Ecumenical Patriarch of Constantinople.
Patriarch Pyrrhus of Constantinople - Ecumenical Patriarch of Constantinople.
Alexios Mosele - Byzantine aristocrat and general
Michael III - Byzantine emperor
Florence Nightingale - English nurse, writer and statistician
Mehmet Akif Ersoy - Turkish poet of the Turkish national anthem
Halide Edib Adıvar - Turkish novelist and feminist political leader
Xenophon Sideridis - Greek historian, writer and researcher
Şeker Ahmed Pasha – Turkish painter
Mehmed Orhan – Turkish aristocrat, a pretender to the throne of the Ottoman Dynasty
Münir Ertegun – Turkish legal counsel in international law to the Ottoman Empire and diplomat of Turkey
Ahmet Ertegun – Turkish-American musician and businessman, and founder and president of Atlantic Records and New York Cosmos soccer team
Nesuhi Ertegun – Turkish-American record producer and executive of Atlantic Records and WEA International
Barış Manço – Turkish rock singer, composer, and television producer
Bülent Ersoy – transgender Turkish celebrity and singer of Ottoman classical music
Özgü Namal – Turkish actress
Billur Kalkavan
Zara
Semahat Özdenses (1913–2008) – Turkish singer and composer of Ottoman classical music
Hasan Çelebi – world-renown master Islamic calligrapher
Kadir Mısıroğlu (1933-2019) – conservative writer and amateur historian
Zabel Sibil Asadour – Armenian poet and writer
Calouste Gulbenkian –  Armenian businessman and philanthropist, once the richest man in the world
Garabet Yazmaciyan – Armenian painter
Onnik Chifte-Saraf – Armenian writer
Gabriel Noradunkyan – Ottoman Armenian politician
Yeghishe Tourian – Armenian Patriarch of Jerusalem and Constantinople
Bedros Tourian – Armenian poet
Hovhannes Hintliyan – Armenian pedagogue and educator
Hrand Nazariantz – Armenian poet and writer
Levon Shant – Armenian poet, writer, and playwright
Sirvart Kalpakyan Karamanuk – Armenian composer, pianist, and teacher
Schahan Berberian – Armenian philosopher, composer, and pedagogue
Srpuhi Kalfayan – Armenian nun and philanthropist
Zabel Yesayan – Armenian poet, writer, and teacher

References

Üsküdar Municipality mayors 
 1984-1989 Necmettin Öztürk, ANAP
 1989-1994 Niyazi Yurtseven, SHP
 1994-1998 Yılmaz Bayat, Refah Party
 1998-2001 Yılmaz Bayat, FP
 2001-2004 Yılmaz Bayat, SP
 2004-2009 Mehmet Çakır (politician), AK Party
 2009-2014 Mustafa Kara, AK Party
 2014-current Mehmet Hilmi Türkmen, AK Party

Bibliography 

 (First published 1938)

 
Bosphorus
Populated places in Istanbul Province
Districts of Istanbul Province
Transit centers in Istanbul
Megarian colonies in Thrace
Chrysopolis
Istanbul pogrom